Golden Ticket may refer to:

Literature & adapted works
 A plot element of the 1964 novel Charlie and the Chocolate Factory, or a plot element of:
 The 1971 film adaptation, Willy Wonka & the Chocolate Factory
 The 2005 film adaptation, Charlie and the Chocolate Factory (film)
 The 2010 opera adaptation, The Golden Ticket
 Two video game interpretations, Charlie and the Chocolate Factory (video games)

Music and television
 Golden Ticket (album), a 2013 album by Danny Byrd
 "Golden Ticket" (song), a song by Highasakite
 "Golden Ticket" (The Office), a 2009 episode of NBC's The Office

Other
 Golden ticket (pickleball), a pass to attend the USA Pickleball National Championships awarded by USA Pickleball
 Golden Ticket Awards, an annual set of awards given out by Amusement Today
 The Golden Passport, a 2017 history of the Harvard Business School and its influence by Duff McDonald